Ramona Reyes Painequeo (born 1967) is a Chilean politician who was elected as a member of the Chilean Constitutional Convention.

On 27 December 2021, it was reported that she is candidate to be the successor of Elisa Loncón in the presidency of the Convention.

References

External links
 

Living people
1967 births
Chilean people of Mapuche descent
People from Santiago
21st-century Chilean politicians
21st-century Chilean women politicians
Socialist Party of Chile politicians
Members of the Chilean Constitutional Convention
Austral University of Chile alumni
Mapuche politicians
Mapuche midwives
Chilean midwives
Chilean municipal councillors
Women mayors of places in Chile